"Dance with Death" is the twelfth episode of the first series of the 1960s cult British spy-fi television series The Avengers, starring Ian Hendry and Patrick Macnee and guest starring Caroline Blakiston, Angela Douglas and Geoffrey Palmer. It was first broadcast by ABC on 15 April 1961. The episode is considered to be lost. The episode was directed by Don Leaver, designed by James Goddard, and written by Peter Ling and Sheilah Ward.

Plot
Dr. Keel saves a dancing instructor from dying from gas asphyxiation. The woman is later discovered strangled with Keel's scarf and he is framed for the murder. Steed suspects the pianist at the woman's dancing school who is accused of numerous murders to be responsible. The killer's trademark is to kill his victims by tossing a radio into the bathtub and electrocuting them. Keel is vindicated by Steed and arrives in the nick of time to stop the killer who has married a young woman and is about to murder her and steal her large cache of diamonds.

Cast
Ian Hendry as Dr. David H. Keel
Patrick Macnee as John Steed
Ingrid Hafner as Carol Wilson
Caroline Blakiston as Elaine Bateman
Norman Chappell as Porter
Angela Douglas as Beth Wilkinson
Diana King as Mrs. Marnell
Geoffrey Palmer as Philip Anthony/Clifford Gardner
Ewan Roberts as Major Caswell
Pauline Shepherd as Valerie Marnell
David Sutton as Trevor Price
Alan Barry as Barman
Ian Hobbs as Teenage Boy
Raymond Hodge as Plainclothes Man
Graham Spurway as Hotel Receptionist
Neil Wilson as Police Sergeant

Production
Production for the episode was completed on 13 April 1961.

References

External links

Episode overview on The Avengers Forever! website

The Avengers (season 1) episodes
Lost television episodes